Delabole railway station was a railway station that served a quarry, rural district, and village of Delabole, situated approximately two miles (3 km) west of Camelford in north  Cornwall, England, UK. It was located on the North Cornwall Railway and named after Delabole Quarry. There were three hamlets in the vicinity, Pengelly, Meadrose, and Rockhead, while the hamlet of Delabole was south of the quarry.

History
Delabole Slate Quarry lay nearby and therefore the station had a large number of sidings. The station had a passing loop, two platforms and a single siding was provided behind the up platform, where the signal box was sited. The station building was on the down side and a short loading dock with the goods shed on a further siding running behind the platform. A single road through engine shed with a turntable beyond sat between the goods shed and a line running to the quarry.

The station was in the village itself and was therefore convenient, also the quarry meant that freight receipts were significant. The loading dock was removed when goods services were withdrawn; the siding on the down side was also removed.

The station was absorbed by the Southern Railway during the Grouping of 1923. The station passed to the Southern Region of British Railways on nationalisation in 1948, and was subsequently closed by the British Railways Board.

The station building is now in use as a private residence, and houses have been built on the site of the up platform.

Memories
One story is told of the guard who left it too late to board the train going to Padstow. Not being able to board the train, the guard outside the train, hanging grimly onto the carriage door, in imminent danger of being crushed on the side of the Railway Bridge as it passed under it. The train was stopped in time and the guard was not injured. During WW2 a plane crashed onto the railway line close to the station and the train coming from Camelford had to be stopped before a collision took place.

References
Notes

Sources
 Butt, R. V. J. (1995). The Directory of Railway Stations: details every public and private passenger station, halt, platform and stopping place, past and present (1st ed.). Sparkford: Patrick Stephens Ltd. . OCLC 60251199.
 Gammell, C. J. (1976). Southern Branch Lines 1955-1965. Oxford : Oxford Publishing Co. SBN 902888-76-5.

External links

 Delabole station in 1975
 Delabole station site prior to re-development
 North Cornwall Railway
 Delabole station

Disused railway stations in Cornwall
Railway stations in Great Britain opened in 1893
Railway stations in Great Britain closed in 1966
Beeching closures in England
Former London and South Western Railway stations